Dorcadion auratum is a species of beetle in the family Cerambycidae. It was described by Henri Tournier in 1872. It is known from the Caucasus Mountains.

References

auratum
Beetles described in 1872